Deszk  ( or Deska) is a village near the city of Szeged, in Csongrád-Csanád County, Hungary. Deszk has a historically important Serb minority that consisted 4.9% of the whole population in 2001. The name of the village was first mentioned in 1490.

Climate

Climate in this area has mild differences between highs and lows, and there is adequate rainfall year-round.  The Köppen Climate Classification subtype for this climate is "Cfb" (Marine West Coast Climate/Oceanic climate).

Twin towns – sister cities

Deszk is twinned with:

 Dealu, Romania
 Donnery, France
 Dumbrava, Romania
 Königstein, Germany
 Ninove, Belgium
 Novi Kneževac, Serbia 
 Rakhiv, Ukraine
 Wiesenbach, Germany

References

External links
Official website

Populated places in Csongrád-Csanád County
Serb communities in Hungary